The South Queensland Crushers were an Australian rugby league football club based in Brisbane, Queensland. In 1992 it was decided that the team would be admitted into the New South Wales Rugby League competition, along with three other teams, as part of the League's expansion plans for professional rugby league in Australia. The competition was re-branded the Australia Rugby League competition in 1995, which was the Crushers' first season.

The Crushers, whose whole existence was against the backdrop of the Super League war, were an unsuccessful club. They had to compete for support with the other Brisbane-based club, the Brisbane Broncos, who were already well-established. The Crushers only competed in the three seasons of the Australian Rugby League's premiership, winning the wooden spoon twice for being last in the competition. Despite the wealth of star players the Crushers managed to attract, they were financially unsustainable and competitively unsuccessful, which ultimately led to their demise at the end of 1997.

History

Formation
The New South Wales Rugby League competition (NSWRL) had begun in 1908 as a rugby league competition in the Sydney region of Australia. For the next eighty years, the league would only feature clubs in the New South Wales region. But in 1988, the NSWRL admitted two Queensland based teams, one from Brisbane and the other from Gold Coast. The Brisbane club was the first NSWRL club to be privately owned and by 1992 had won their first premiership.  On 30 November 1992, the NSWRL formally admitted a second Brisbane-based team into the competition, along with three others, from Townsville, Perth and New Zealand. The newly established Brisbane team was to be known as the South Queensland Crushers, and would enter the 1995 NSWRL competition, which had been renamed the Australian Rugby League competition (ARL).

In September 1993, the Crushers chose Bill Gardner as the coach for the team, but after a poor off-season, he was replaced by former Australian international Bob Lindner. Darryl van der Velde, an experienced rugby league coach from England, was the club's inaugural chief executive. The club had chosen Lang Park as their home ground which had been abandoned by the Brisbane Broncos in favour of QE II Stadium in 1992.

The Crushers were able to sign Queensland representative players Trevor Gillmeister, Mark Hohn and Dale Shearer, as well as three rugby union players including Garrick Morgan who had represented Australia in the fifteen-man code. The Crushers had attempted to lure former Australian international captain Mal Meninga from retirement for one more season, but failed. By the beginning of the 1995 competition, the Crushers had also signed North Sydney forward Mario Fenech, who the club named as their captain. The club's major sponsor was XXXX with Qantas announced as the sleeve sponsor.

The club competed in the Brisbane Rugby League premiership in 1994 and 1995 to prepare for entry into the ARL.

1995 season - The first season
The Crushers' first match was against the previous season's premiers, Canberra which they lost along with their next three before winning their first match 16–12 against North Sydney in Round five. Trevor Gillmeister had the honour of scoring the Crusher's first ever try. An injury to Dale Shearer and the difficulties for Garrick Morgan to adapt to rugby league saw the Crushers fail to utilise much of its attacking potential. Captain Fenech was dropped to the interchange bench and lost the captaincy which was passed on to Gillmeister. The season's end was dampened after coach Lindner and Fenech feuded, resulting in Fenech being released from the final year of his contract.

In the 1995 season, the club had only won six and drew another in the twenty-two games played. In 1995, News Limited, a mass media company, began deliberating a rival rugby league competition, the Super League, and with the rival Broncos a key part of the plans for Super League, the Crushers remained loyal to the ARL competition. The Crushers believed that they would survive and be able to compete on their own. The ARL supported this despite the disappointing results of their first season because of the high home ground crowds, with supporters averaging over 21,000 a season.

1996 season - The second season
The club had bought five players from the Sydney Roosters to help them improve from their inaugural season, and Queensland representative Tony Hearn also joined the club for the 1996 season. The opening round of the 1996 season the club gathered two points because of Canberra's forfeit but the club only recorded three more wins in the entire season gathering six points on the competition ladder and took the wooden spoon for being last on the ladder. The Crushers won the second round clash against Parramatta before losing ten in a row. The Crushers then won two in a row before plummeting to lose their last eight matches.

Despite a record crowd of 34,263 that watched the Crushers take on the Brisbane Broncos in round 4, the Crushers home ground support only averaged over 13,000 each game. The diminishing crowd numbers and player payments meant the club was on the brink of bankruptcy. The ARL and a mystery supporter bailed the club out with over half a million dollars in financial relief. With first-grade rugby league divided between two competitions, it would be hard for the Crushers to recoup lost money in establishing the club as it ploughed further into debt.

A glimmer of hope for the club came when the Crushers won the Under 21's premiership, defeating the Parramatta Eels in the Under 21's Grand Final. This was to be the only premiership of any competition or grade for the Crushers.

1997 season - The third and final season
The 1997 season was not much better for the Crushers, again taking the wooden spoon for the second year running. Major sponsor XXXX was replaced as the major sponsor by AVJennings. The club only won four games of the twenty-two match season. The 1997 season for the Crushers saw their home game attendances dwindle to an average of 7,000 and even with free days, which allowed supporters to come to the games free of charge, the club didn't gather support as it had in its inaugural season. The Crushers did however win their final match of the season convincingly 39–18 over the Western Suburbs Magpies and along with the North Sydney Bears and Newtown Jets, the South Queensland Crushers remain one of the few defunct clubs to have won their final game.

Demise
With the unification of the Australian Rugby League and Super League competitions following the 1997 season, the new National Rugby League competition was formed. This meant that three of the twenty-two teams participating in 1997 would be axed as part of the rationalisation process aimed at reducing teams to an optimal number. With the introduction of the Melbourne Storm and the fact that the agreement between the Australian Rugby League and Super League was to have a fourteen-team competition in 2000, the future for the Crushers was inevitably demise.

In late 1997, the club's only option of survival was to merge, with the most likely contender the Gold Coast Chargers, who like the Crushers, were struggling to be able to compete in the competition with the hugely successful Brisbane Broncos being the dominant team in south-east Queensland. However, the National Rugby League approved the Gold Coast team for the 1998 season, and they went alone into the re-unified competition. The South Queensland Crushers were liquidated in December 1997 with debts totalling over A$3 million.

Season Summaries

Notable players

Over their three-year presence in the Australian Rugby League premiership, the club managed to produce one Australian international player, Trevor Gillmeister.

Other notable players include Dale Shearer, Mark Hohn, Craig Teevan, Mario Fenech, William David Gressly, Nigel Gaffey, John Jones, Tony Kemp, Phillip Lee, Danny Nutley, Mark Protheroe and Kurt Wrigley. Players who went on to be successful with other clubs include Clinton Schifcofske, Mark Tookey, Scott Sattler, Travis Norton, Chris McKenna, St John Ellis, Steele Retchless and Danny Nutley.

Records
Club records from 1995–1997.

Premierships 
1st Grade: 0
2nd Grade: 0
3rd Grade/Presidents Cup: 1 (1996)
Pre Season: 0

Biggest Wins

Biggest Losses

Most games for club
 58 Craig Teevan (1995-1997)

Most points for club
 108 (7 tries, 40 goals), Clinton Schifcofske (1996-1997)

Most tries for club
 11, Jason Hudson (1996-1997)

Most goals for club
 40, Clinton Schifcofske (1996-1997)

Most points in a season
 94 (6 tries, 35 goals), Clinton Schifcofske in 1997

Most tries in a season
 9, David Krause in 1995
 9, Jason Hudson in 1997

Most goals in a season
 35 (35/67 - 61.40%), Clinton Schifcofske in 1997

Longest Winning Streak
2 matches, 30 June - 7 July 1996.

Longest Losing Streak
10 matches, 7 April - 22 June 1996.

Largest Attendance (home)
34,263 vs Brisbane Broncos, Round 4, 1996

Smallest Attendance (home)
2,364 vs Illawarra Steelers, Round 16, 1997

Largest Attendance (away)
49,607 vs Brisbane Broncos at ANZ Stadium, Round 4, 1995

Smallest Attendance (away)
3,107 vs South Sydney Rabbitohs at Redfern Oval, Round 15, 1996

References
Notes

Sources
 
 
  

 
1992 establishments in Australia
Rugby clubs established in 1992
Defunct rugby league teams in Australia